Carousel or Carousel International, also known by its transliterated Russian name Карусель, is a Russian television channel dedicated to children and youth. It was founded by Russian President Dmitry Medvedev. It is currently available in Russia, in France via Free, and in the United States via DirecTV.

Since the 2022 Russian invasion of Ukraine, they are only airing Russian cartoons and some cartoons outside Russia, except 2x2 and still airing animated films of the world.

Shows 
Carousel programming consists of a wide range of shows ranging from original animated and live-action Russian productions to famous cartoons from around the world, all either original or voiced-over into the Russian language. The schedule changes on an almost weekly basis to accommodate its vast library of shows both modern and vintage.

Programs 
Masha and the Bear
Rob the Robot 
Let's Go Luna! 
Santiago of the Seas
Butterbean's Café 
Abby Hatcher 
Jonny Quest 
Alphablocks
Dog with a Blog 
 Dorg van Dango
Sarah & Duck 
Hey Duggee 
Peter Rabbit 
Numberblocks 
Hank Zipzer 
Puppy Dog Pals 
Lazer Tag Academy 
Woolly and Tig 
Top Cat 
Treehouse Detectives 
Bluey 
Clangers 
The Hogan Family 
Corn & Peg 
Nina and the Neurons 
Dance-A-Lot Robot
Hero Elementary 
Llama Llama 
Xavier Riddle and the Secret Museum 
Mecha Builders 
The Creature Cases
Mr Bloom's Nursery 
Topsy and Tim 
The Smurfs 
Something Special 
Ruff-Ruff, Tweet and Dave 
Floogals 
SpongeBob SquarePants (9th-11th seasons)
Teenage Mutant Ninja Turtles (2017–19, first-run/2020, re-runs)
Rise of the Teenage Mutant Ninja Turtles
Blue's Clues & You!
Prostokvashino
My Little Pony: Tell Your Tale
The Fixies
Fish Hooks
The New Adventures of Winnie the Pooh
Adventures of the Gummi Bears
Daniel Tiger's Neighborhood
Tina & Tony
Winx Club
The Jetsons
Jabberjaw
WordWorld 
Bob the Builder (17th-21st seasons)
Postman Pat
 Puppies & Kittens 
All Grown Up!
Oddbods
Bookaboo
Woodventures
Fantasy Patrol 
Be-Be-Bears
PAW Patrol
Blaze and the Monster Machines
New Looney Tunes
 Coconut, the Little Dragon
Inspector Gadget 
Paper Tales
Cutie Cubies
Yoko 
Snow Queen: Gerda and the Keepers of Wonders 
ALVINNN!!! and the Chipmunks
Thomas & Friends 
Chuggington
Qumi-Qumi
Kid-E-Cats 
Top Wing
Rainbow Ruby
Rainbow Butterfly Unicorn Kitty
Ben & Holly's Little Kingdom
Polly Pocket
In The Night Garden
Zig & Sharko
Oggy and the Cockroaches
Super Wings
Enchantimals
Fireman Sam
Geronimo Stilton 
LazyTown
Tayo the Little Bus
Maya the Honey Bee
Metalions
Charlie and Lola
The Smurfs
Kongsuni & Friends
Angelina Ballerina: The Next Steps
Screechers Wild!
Infinity Nado
Baby Looney Tunes
The Adventures of Blinky Bill
Orange Moo Cow
Zou
Talking Tom & Friends 
Babar and the Adventures of Badou
Mike the Knight
Lego City Adventures
Rev & Roll
Barbie: Dreamtopia
The Looney Tunes Show
Famous 5: On the Case
PINY: Institute of New York
Marvi Hämmer
Little Charley Bear
In the World of Animals 
My Little Pony: Friendship is Magic
Sonic Boom
Lego Friends
Robocar Poli
Ricky Zoom
Dinosaur Train
Moominvalley
The Tom and Jerry Show
44 Cats
My Little Pony: Pony Life
Bouli
The Pingu Show 
Rupert Bear, Follow the Magic...
The Cockroach Kids
Pocoyo
Larva
Tales of Tatonka
Beyblade Burst
Robot Trains
Yo-Kai Watch
Transformers: Rescue Bots
Transformers: Cyberverse
Gormiti
Ebb and Flo
Lego Nexo Knights
Lego Elves
Super 4
World of Winx
Tabaluga
Bernard
Little Battlers Experience
Transformers: Prime
Transformers: Robots in Disguise
My Little Pony: Equestria Girls
Ben 10
The Mojicons
Everything's Rosie
Make Way for Noddy
Adiboo Adventure
Tom and Jerry Tales
Legends of Spark
Odd Squad
Ninjago
The Adventures of Paddington Bear
Vroomiz
Finley the Fire Engine
Strawberry Shortcake's Berry Bitty Adventures
Power Players
Trucktown
DC Super Hero Girls
Shimmer and Shine
Thomas & Friends: All Engines Go
Rubbadubbers
Tree Fu Tom
Boonie Bears
Bing
Transformers: Rescue Bots Academy
Tobot
Hanazuki: Full of Treasures
Monkart
Sunny Day
Regal Academy
Katuri
Kitty Is Not a Cat
Invention Story
Leo & Tig
Vic the Viking
Nils Holgersson
Lego Jurassic World: Legend of Isla Nublar
Super Spin Combo
Hairdorables
The Psammy Show
Littlest Pet Shop
Littlest Pet Shop: A World of Our Own
True and the Rainbow Kingdom
Peg + Cat (Пег + Кот)
Pippi Longstocking 
Lalaloopsy 
The Barkers 
Baby Shark's Big Show!
Pikwik Pack
Dino City
My Little Pony: A New Generation
Waffle the Wonder Dog
Leave It to Beaver
Bonanza
ChalkZone

History
Carousel was created in 2010 after Bibigon (Бибигон) and TeleNanny (ТелеНяня) merged to form the new channel. The first program shown was "Team Jump-Jump" (Прыг-Скок Команда)

References

External links
Official site

Carousel (TV channel)
Television channels and stations established in 2010
2010 establishments in Russia
Russian-language television stations in Russia
Commercial-free television networks
Children's television networks